Ağacanlı (also, Agadzhanly) is a village and municipality in the Hajigabul Rayon of Azerbaijan.  It has a population of 351.

References 

Ağacanlı is the native name for the area . the alternative name for this area is Agacanli. This geographical location for agacanli is Azerbaijan, Asia.

Populated places in Hajigabul District